Association Sportive des Forces Armées de Guinée, known ASFAG, as is a Guinean football club based in Conakry. The team played many seasons in the Guinée Championnat National.
In 2003 the club has won the Guinée Championnat National.

Stadium
Currently the team plays at the 25000 capacity Stade du 28 Septembre.

Achievements

National
Guinée Championnat National: 1
Champion: 2003

Guinée Coupe Nationale: 3
Winner: 1987, 1991, 1996

International
UFOA Cup: 1
Winner: 1988

References

External links
Team profile – Soccerway.com

Football clubs in Guinea
Military association football clubs